Iran Davar Ardalan (born April 1, 1964) is a tech entrepreneur, journalist, and author based in Washington, D.C. Known as Davar Ardalan, she is the Executive Producer of Audio at National Geographic and has served as co-chair of the Cultural Heritage and AI track at ITU's AI for Good. Prior to this, she was deputy director of the White House Presidential Innovation Fellowship Program in Washington, D.C. She was also a long-time journalist at NPR News, where she helped shape the news shows Weekend Edition and Morning Edition, and was responsible for decisions that required elaborate coordination such as live broadcasts from Baghdad, Kabul, and New Orleans. Ardalan is an advocate for cross-platform storytelling. At NPR, her real-time storytelling campaigns cultivated thought leaders across platforms and reached millions on Twitter and Facebook.

From 2018 to 2022, Ardalan was the founder and chief storytelling officer at IVOW (Intelligent Voices of Wisdom), which champions culturally conscious data strategies across multiple industries, from academia to development and enterprise. In April 2021, Project Voice awarded IVOW the Google Developer of the Year and a medal for Diversity and Inclusion.

Ardalan has also served as Managing Editor at Hanson Robotics, and is a member of the AI for Good Brain Trust, composed of an international panel of innovators and thinkers from industry, United Nations (UN) agencies, nongovernmental organizations (NGOs), civil society, the UN's member states, academia, start-ups, media and the arts who assist in identifying initiatives aimed at using AI to advance the UN SDGs.

Davar Ardalan has been recognized with a NASA Team Leadership award for Space Apps, two NABJ Awards, a Gracie Award from the American Women in Radio and Television and a shout-out in the comic strip Zippy. In May 2014, she was the recipient of an Ellis Island Medal of Honor, for individual achievement and for promoting cultural unity.

She is the author of two books, My Name is Iran and The Persian Square.

Career
Ardalan's career in American media began in 1991 at KOAT-TV in Albuquerque, New Mexico. A year later, she made the switch to radio as a reporter at KUNM-FM in Albuquerque. She produced award-winning cultural and news stories on health and environmental concerns in Los Alamos for which she won first place in documentaries from the Associated Press in New Mexico.

National Geographic 
Ardalan joined National Geographic in August 2020. As National Geographic's executive producer of audio, she oversees the award-winning podcast series Overheard, as well as the limited series Into the Depths, which followed a group of Black divers dedicated to finding and documenting some of the thousand slave ships that wrecked in the Atlantic Ocean during the transatlantic slave trade. Together with National Geographic Society, Ardalan's audio team has also piloted Soundbank, a database featuring crowdsourced sounds of nature from explorers and photographers around the world.

White House Presidential Innovation Fellowship 

Davar Ardalan joined the White House Presidential Innovation Fellows program (PIF) as deputy director and Director of Storytelling in October 2018, working with Executive Director Joshua DiFrances. The fellowship pairs entrepreneurs, designers and innovators from the private sector to team up with forward-thinking agency partners to modernize critical government services, including transportation, healthcare, veterans affairs, and American technology, as well as hosting engagement workshops on data and digital storytelling.

Second muse 
As Director of Storytelling, Ardalan led campaigns for clients such as NASA, USAID, the Australian Aid program, and the World Bank. These campaigns centered around big data, sustainability, ocean health, food and nutrition, and materials innovation. In 2017, Ardalan designed an immersive storytelling project around healthy eating in the South Pacific funded by the innovationXchange of the Australian Ministry of Foreign Affairs. The pilots launched in the South Pacific in 2018 and were geared towards tackling malnutrition and bringing back pride to traditional diets via VR and gamification.

NPR 
Ardalan joined NPR in 1993. She began as a temporary production assistant in July 1993 and moved to a full-time production assistant position at Weekend Edition Sunday a year later.

She held many titles at NPR News, including Senior Producer of NPR's Identify and Culture Unit, Senior Supervising Producer of Weekend Edition, Senior Supervising Producer of Morning Edition. Throughout her career, she has produced a wide array of radio stories, especially those pertaining to the culture, art, history, women's rights, and politics in Iran, as well as issues surrounding the wars in Iraq and Afghanistan.

Ardalan left NPR in 2010, but subsequently came back to the organization. Ardalan was the senior producer of NPR's Tell Me More and in 2015, her last position at NPR was Senior Producer of the Identity and Culture Unit.

Author of The Persian Square 
Ardalan is the author of The Persian Square, an intimate but historically grounded telling of how American and Iranian traditions have embraced one another. This digital book, available on iTunes and Kindle, offers a vivid portrait of Iranian Americans — exploring the early intersections between the two countries' citizens and the unexpected places where American and Iranian tradition have embraced one another. It includes historical documents, handwritten letters, archival photos, and over 30 media files including music, videos and several audio recordings from 1912, 1915, and 1924 used with permission from Sony Music. The book also contains links to certain NPR stories from between 1995 and 2012 with permission from NPR.

Author of My Name is Iran 
In 2004, Ardalan's full name, Iran Davar Ardalan, inspired the three-part NPR/American Radioworks series, My Name is Iran, which traced her Iranian heritage, as well as her own experiences after the 1979 Islamic revolution. In 1984, she was an English news anchor at IRIB News broadcasting throughout the Persian Gulf Region. In her book, she writes about the struggle of a nation as reflected in her family's story led to her memoir My Name Is Iran published by Henry Holt in 2008.

Education
Ardalan earned a B.A. in communications and journalism from the University of New Mexico. She was born in San Francisco and has also lived and worked in Iran as a television newscaster for IRIB English News. Ardalan attended elementary and middle school at Iranzamin International School in Tehran and graduated from Brookline High School in Brookline, Massachusetts.

Family 
She is a great-granddaughter of Ali-Akbar Davar and is married to John Oliver Smith, an environmental engineer and entrepreneur. Ardalan and Smith have raised eight children together and live in the Washington, D.C., metro area.

Her mother was Laleh Bakhtiar (born Mary Nell Bakhtiar), a renowned Iranian-American scholar, lauded for Islamic spirituality and Quranic critical thinking. Bakhtiar authored, translated, edited, and adapted over 150 books including The Sense of Unity with her then-husband Nader Ardalan, and Sufi Expressions of the Mystic Quest. One of her proudest accomplishments came in 2007 with her translation of the Quran called The Sublime Quran. Ardalan serves as a board member and Director of Data for Bakhtiar's Institute of Traditional Psychoethics and Guidance, and is building a conversational AI based on her mother's work.

Her father is Nader Ardalan, an architect with a long and distinguished international career in the fields of planning, architecture and historic preservation. He is a recognized world leader and expert in the field of environmentally sustainable and culturally relevant design.

Her grandmother, Helen Jeffreys Bakhtiar, a public health worker in Iran during the 1950s, was honored by the nomadic Bakhtiari tribe, who named a mountain after her.

Ardalan's cousins are poet/novelist Lailee Bakhtiar (née McNair) and former tennis player Fred McNair. Her uncle Jamshid, better known as Jim, was a fullback and placekicker at the University of Virginia and he was selected by the Football Writers Association of America as a first-team back on its 1957 College Football All-America Team; he later became a psychiatrist.

Ardalan's parents married in 1960 and divorced in 1976.

Awards and recognition 
In April 2002, Ardalan and Jacki Lyden received a Gracie award from the American Women in Radio and Television for the NPR documentary Loss and Its Aftermath, the story of Israeli and Palestinian parents speaking about the deaths of their children in the conflict.

On May 10, 2014, Ardalan was awarded an Ellis Island Medal of Honor at a ceremony in New York City. This honor is awarded to "American citizens who have distinguished themselves within their own ethnic groups while exemplifying the values of the American way of life."

In March 2022, Ardalan's team at National Geographic's Overheard were honored at the Ambies for Best Knowledge, Science and Tech Podcast. The team also won three Anthem Awards in February 2022: Gold for the episode In Conversation: Reframing Black History and Culture, and two silver medals, for Searching for the Himalaya’s Ghost Cats and Olympic Training During a Pandemic. In May 2022, Overheard received a Webby, in the category of Diversity and Inclusion in Podcast, for its episode A Reckoning in Tulsa.

References

American radio producers
NPR personalities
1964 births
Living people
University of New Mexico alumni
Brookline High School alumni
Radio personalities from San Francisco
American writers of Iranian descent
Women radio producers